In phonetics, advanced tongue root (ATR) and retracted tongue root (RTR) are contrasting states of the root of the tongue during the pronunciation of vowels in some languages, especially in Western and Eastern Africa, but also in Kazakh and Mongolian. ATR vs RTR was once suggested to be the basis for the distinction between tense and lax vowels in European languages such as German, but that no longer seems tenable.

Advanced tongue root 
Advanced tongue root, abbreviated ATR or +ATR, also called expanded, involves the expansion of the pharyngeal cavity by moving the base of the tongue forward and often lowering the larynx during the pronunciation of a vowel. The lowering of the larynx sometimes adds a breathy quality to the vowel.

Voiced stops such as  can often involve non-contrastive tongue root advancement whose results can be seen occasionally in sound changes relating stop voicing and vowel frontness such as voicing stop consonants before front vowels in the Oghuz Turkic languages or in Adjarian's law: the fronting of vowels after voiced stops in certain dialects of Armenian.

True uvular consonants appear to be incompatible with advanced tongue root, i.e. they are inherently [−ATR]. Combined with the above tendency for voiced stops to be [+ATR], that motivates the extreme rarity of the voiced uvular stop  compared to its voiceless counterpart .

The International Phonetic Alphabet represents ATR with a "left tack" diacritic, .

In languages in which they occur, advanced-tongue-root vowels very often contrast with retracted tongue root (RTR) vowels in a system of vowel harmony, which occurs commonly in large parts of West Africa.

ATR vowels involve a certain tension in the tongue, often in the lips and jaw as well; the ear can often perceive this tension as a "brightness" (narrow formants) compared to RTR vowels. Nonetheless, phoneticians do not refer to ATR vowels as tense vowels since the word tense already has several meanings in European phonetics.

Retracted tongue root
Retracted tongue root, abbreviated RTR, is the retraction of the base of the tongue in the pharynx during the pronunciation of a vowel, the opposite articulation of advanced tongue root. This type of vowel has also been referred to as pharyngealized. 

The neutral position of the tongue during the pronunciation of a vowel, contrasting with advanced tongue root and thus marked -ATR, is also sometimes referred to as retracted tongue root.

The diacritic for RTR in the International Phonetic Alphabet is the right tack, .

Tongue root position and vowel harmony
As mentioned above, many African languages, such as Maasai, have systems of vowel harmony based on tongue root position. That is illustrated here with the Fante dialect of Akan, which has fifteen vowels: five +ATR vowels, five −ATR vowels, and five nasal vowels. 

{| class=wikitable
|+Fante ±ATR vowels
! Ortho-graphy !! +ATRvalue !! −ATRvalue !! Approx. Europeanequivalents
|-
! i 
|  || || 
|-
! e 
|  ||   || , 
|-
! ɛ 
|  ||  || 
|-
! a 
|  ||  || , 
|-
! ɔ 
|  ||  || 
|-
! o 
|  ||  || , 
|-
! u 
|  || ||  
|}

There are two harmonization rules that govern the vowels that may co-occur in a word:
All −ATR vowels become +ATR when followed by a peripheral +ATR vowel. That is, orthographic e ɛ a ɔ o become i e a o u before i u and sometimes before a.
As long as it does not conflict with the previous rule, the +ATR mid vowels become −ATR high vowels when preceded by a −ATR non-high vowel. (It is not reflected in the orthography; underlying and surface vowels are both spelled e o.)

In the Twi language, the ±ATR distinction has merged in the low vowel and so  is harmonically neutral, occurring with either set of vowels.

Tongue root and phonation
With advances in fiber-optic laryngoscopy at the end of the twentieth century, new types of phonation were discovered that involve more of the larynx than just the glottis. One of the few languages studied thus far, the Togolese language Kabiyé, has a vocalic distinction that had been assumed to be one of tongue root. However, it turned out to be a phonation distinction of faucalized voice versus harsh voice.

It is not yet clear whether that is characteristic of ±ATR distinctions in general.

Additional images

See also
The back-vowel constraint, an effect of tongue-root retraction in some click consonants.

References

Sources

External links
 Maasai Vowels, with audio examples of [+ATR] and [-ATR]

Vowels